Stephen Warmolts (born 10 April 1994) is a Dutch footballer who plays as a right back for Kozakken Boys. He formerly played for SC Heerenveen and Helmond Sport.

External links
 

1994 births
Living people
Association football fullbacks
Dutch footballers
SC Heerenveen players
Helmond Sport players
FC Emmen players
Eredivisie players
Eerste Divisie players
Tweede Divisie players
HHC Hardenberg players
Footballers from Emmen, Netherlands
Kozakken Boys players